Arenzville Township is one of eleven townships in Cass County, Illinois, USA.  As of the 2020 census, its population was 742 and it contained 340 housing units.

Geography

Cities, towns, villages
 Arenzville

Cemeteries
The township contains these thirteen cemeteries: Arenzville City East, Arenzville City North, Buck, Green-Krohe, Huffman, James Davis, Jockisch Methodist, Krohe, Monroe, Treadway-Miller, Trinity Lutheran, Tureman and Wiggens.

Demographics
As of the 2020 census there were 742 people, 332 households, and 264 families residing in the township. The racial makeup of the township was 94.07% White, 1.08% African American, 0.00% Native American, 0.00% Asian, 0.13% Pacific Islander, 0.94% from other races, and 3.77% from two or more races. Hispanic or Latino of any race were 2.83% of the population.

There were 332 households, out of which 24.10% had children under the age of 18 living with them, 75.90% were married couples living together, 1.51% had a female householder with no spouse present, and 20.48% were non-families. 16.90% of all households were made up of individuals, and 6.00% had someone living alone who was 65 years of age or older. The average household size was 2.33 and the average family size was 2.59.

The township's age distribution consisted of 21.1% under the age of 18, 2.7% from 18 to 24, 28.5% from 25 to 44, 19.1% from 45 to 64, and 28.6% who were 65 years of age or older. The median age was 43.3 years. For every 100 females, there were 126.0 males. For every 100 females age 18 and over, there were 116.3 males.

The median income for a household in the township was $66,250, and the median income for a family was $69,375. Males had a median income of $45,772 versus $35,000 for females. The per capita income for the township was $34,202. About 0.8% of families and 2.3% of the population were below the poverty line, including 0.0% of those under age 18 and 0.5% of those age 65 or over.

School districts
 Beardstown Community Unit School District 15
 Triopia Community Unit School District 27
 Virginia Community Unit School District 64

Political districts
 Illinois' 18th congressional district
 State House District 93
 State Senate District 47

References
 
 United States Census Bureau 2007 TIGER/Line Shapefiles
 United States National Atlas

External links
 City-Data.com
 Illinois State Archives

Townships in Cass County, Illinois
Townships in Illinois
1923 establishments in Illinois